Walter Foster (born 24 May 1915, date of death unknown) was a Barbadian cricketer. He played in one first-class match for the Barbados cricket team in 1941/42.

See also
 List of Barbadian representative cricketers

References

External links
 

1915 births
Year of death missing
Barbadian cricketers
Barbados cricketers
People from Saint Michael, Barbados